The 11th Central American and Caribbean Games were held in Panama City, the capital of Panama from February 28 to March 13, 1970. These games featured 21 participating nations and a total number of 2,095 athletes.

Sports

References
 Meta
 

 
Central American and Caribbean Games, 1970
Central American and Caribbean Games
Central American and Caribbean Games, 1970
Central American and Caribbean Games
1970 in Caribbean sport
1970 in Central American sport
Multi-sport events in Panama
20th century in Panama City
February 1970 sports events in North America
March 1970 sports events in North America
Sports competitions in Panama City